Steve Schmidt, Stephen Schmidt, or Steven Schmidt could refer to: 

Steve Schmidt (born 1970), American political consultant
Steven Schmidt, American environmental activist
Steve Schmidt (Canadian football) (born 1984)

See also
Steven Smith (disambiguation)